Zhaba (Mandarin: 扎巴镇) is a town in Hualong Hui Autonomous County, Haidong, Qinghai, China. In 2010, Zhaba had a total population of 19,032: 9,595 males and 9,437 females: 5,675 aged under 14, 12,385 aged between 15 and 65 and 972 aged over 65.

References 
 

Township-level divisions of Qinghai
Haidong
Towns in China